Janin Store, also known as the Old Janin Store, is a historic commercial building located at 123 North Morgan Avenue in Broussard, Louisiana.

Built c.1890 by Francois Janin, the structure is an Italianate style one-and-a-half story frame commercial building. The store was run by Janin family until late 1960s.

The building was listed on the National Register of Historic Places on March 14, 1983.

It is one of 10 individually NRHP-listed properties in the "Broussard Multiple Resource Area", which also includes: 
Alesia House
Billeaud House
Martial Billeaud Jr. House  
Valsin Broussard House 
Comeaux House 
Ducrest Building

Roy-LeBlanc House 
St. Cecilia School 
St. Julien House 
Main Street Historic District

See also
 National Register of Historic Places listings in Lafayette Parish, Louisiana

References

Commercial buildings on the National Register of Historic Places in Louisiana
Italianate architecture in Louisiana
Commercial buildings completed in 1890
Lafayette Parish, Louisiana
National Register of Historic Places in Lafayette Parish, Louisiana